Callum Bruce (born 9 June 1983 in Hastings, New Zealand) is a New Zealand rugby union player.

Super 14
Bruce formerly played for the Super Rugby team Highlanders. He played for the Super Rugby team Chiefs. Although his normal position is second five-eighth, Bruce has also covered first five-eighth for the Highlanders when regular fly-half Nick Evans has been injured.

In June 2010 it was announced that Callum would be moving to play in Japan.

External links
Chiefs profile
 Highlanders player profile

1983 births
Living people
New Zealand rugby union players
Māori All Blacks players
New Zealand expatriate rugby union players
Expatriate rugby union players in Japan
New Zealand expatriate sportspeople in Japan
Otago rugby union players
Highlanders (rugby union) players
Chiefs (rugby union) players
Waikato rugby union players
Yokohama Canon Eagles players
People educated at Napier Boys' High School
Rugby union players from Hastings, New Zealand